Kevin Hervey (born July 9, 1996) is an American professional basketball player, who most recently played for Virtus Bologna of the Italian Lega Basket Serie A (LBA) and the EuroLeague. He played college basketball for UT Arlington.

College career 
Hervey came into UT Arlington at only 180 pounds before eventually reaching 210 pounds by his senior season. Hervey played four years for the Mavericks. In his sophomore season, Hervey averaged 18.1 points and 9.8 rebounds per game. He missed the last 19 games of the season due to a torn ACL in his left knee.

As a junior, Hervey averaged 17.1 points and 8.5 rebounds per game but had some lingering effects from the ACL tear in the early season. He led the Mavericks to a 27–9 season, the most wins in school history, and NIT quarterfinal run. He was named Sun Belt Conference Player of the Year and earned all-district honors from both the National Association of Basketball Coaches and the U.S. Basketball Writers Association. Hervey is the second Texas–Arlington player after Marquez Haynes to be named an AP Honorable Mention All-American. He was twice named Sun Belt Player of the Week, on December 6, 2016 and February 20, 2017.

As a senior, Hervey averaged 21.1 points and 8.7 rebounds per game. He was named to the first-team All-Sun Belt team for the second consecutive year.

Professional career

Oklahoma City Blue (2018–2020)
Hervey was chosen with 57th pick in the 2018 NBA Draft by the Oklahoma City Thunder. He became the fourth player from the University of Texas-Arlington to be selected in an NBA Draft, with the last players being selected in 1982. Hervey averaged 7.2 points, 2.6 rebounds and one assist per game in five summer league games. On October 5, 2018, he was signed by the Thunder's G League affiliate Oklahoma City Blue.

Oklahoma City Thunder (2019–2020)
On December 12, 2019, the Oklahoma City Thunder announced that they had signed a two-way contract with Hervey. Throughout the contract, Hervey would split his playing time between the Oklahoma City Thunder and their NBA G League affiliate, the Oklahoma City Blue. In nine games, Hervey averaged 1.7 points and 1.2 rebounds per game for the Thunder.

Lokomotiv Kuban (2020–2021)
On September 20, 2020, Hervey signed a one-year deal with Lokomotiv Kuban of the VTB United League and the EuroCup.

Virtus Bologna (2021–2022)
On July 10, 2021, Hervey signed a two-years deal with Virtus Bologna of the Italian Lega Basket Serie A. On September 21, the team won its second Supercup, defeating Olimpia Milano 90–84. Moreover, after having ousted Lietkabelis, Ulm and Valencia in the first three rounds of the playoffs, on 11 May 2022, Virtus defeated Frutti Extra Bursaspor by 80–67 at the Segafredo Arena, winning its first EuroCup and qualifying for the EuroLeague after 14 years. However, despite having ended the regular season at the first place and having ousted 3–0 both Pesaro and Tortona in the first two rounds of playoffs, Virtus was defeated 4–2 in the national finals by Olimpia Milan.

Career statistics

NBA

|-
| style="text-align:left;"| 
| style="text-align:left;"| Oklahoma City
| 10 || 0 || 5.2 || .259 || .150 || — || 1.2 || .5 || .1 || .1 || 1.7
|- class="sortbottom"
| style="text-align:center;" colspan="2"| Career
| 10 || 0 || 5.2 || .259 || .150 || — || 1.2 || .5 || .1 || .1 || 1.7

References

External links
UT Arlington Mavericks bio

1996 births
Living people
American expatriate basketball people in Russia
American men's basketball players
Basketball players from Texas
Oklahoma City Blue players
Oklahoma City Thunder draft picks
Oklahoma City Thunder players
PBC Lokomotiv-Kuban players
Power forwards (basketball)
Sportspeople from Arlington, Texas
UT Arlington Mavericks men's basketball players
Virtus Bologna players